The 1998–99 Segunda Divisão de Honra season was the ninth season of the competition and the 65th season of recognised second-tier football in Portugal.

Overview
The league was contested by 18 teams with Gil Vicente FC winning the championship and gaining promotion to the Primeira Liga along with Os Belenenses and CD Santa Clara. At the other end of the table CD Feirense, União Funchal and GD Estoril Praia were relegated to the Segunda Divisão.

League standings

Footnotes

External links
 Portugal 1998/99 - RSSSF (Jorge Santos, Jan Schoenmakers and Daniel Dalence)
 Portuguese II Liga 1998/1999 - footballzz.co.uk

Portuguese Second Division seasons
Port
Segunda Divisão de Honra